The Butuobinskaya mine or Botuobinskaya mine is one of the largest diamond mines in Russia and in the world. The mine is located in the north-eastern part of the country in the Sakha Republic. The mine has estimated reserves of 93 million carats of diamonds and an annual production capacity of 0.2 million carats. In 2018, the mine produced 1.4 million carats. The mine is a short drive from another diamond mine, the Nurbinskaya diamond mine.

References 

Diamond mines in Russia